Rafael Vicente Correa Delgado (born 6 April 1963) is an Ecuadorian politician and economist who served as President of Ecuador from 2007 to 2017. The leader of the PAIS Alliance political movement from its foundation until 2017, Correa is a democratic socialist and his administration focused on the implementation of left-wing policies. Internationally, he served as president pro tempore of the UNASUR.

Born to a lower middle-class mestizo family in Guayaquil, Correa studied economics at the Universidad Católica de Santiago de Guayaquil, the University of Louvain (UCLouvain), and the University of Illinois, where he received his PhD. Returning to Ecuador, in 2005 he became the Minister for the Economy under President Alfredo Palacio, successfully lobbying Congress for increased spending on health and education projects.

Correa won the presidency in the 2006 general election on a platform criticizing the established political elites. Taking office in January 2007, he sought to move away from Ecuador's neoliberal economic model by reducing the influence of the World Bank and International Monetary Fund. He oversaw the introduction of a new constitution, being re-elected in 2009 and again in the 2013 general election.

Correa's presidency was part of the Latin American pink tide, a turn toward leftist governments in the region, allying himself with Hugo Chávez's Venezuela and bringing Ecuador into the Bolivarian Alliance for the Americas in June 2009. Using its own form of 21st century socialism, Correa's administration increased government spending, reducing poverty, raising the minimum wage and increasing the standard of living in Ecuador. Between 2006 and 2016, poverty decreased from 36.7% to 22.5% and annual per capita GDP growth was 1.5 percent (as compared to 0.6 percent over the prior two decades). At the same time, economic inequality, as measured by the Gini coefficient, decreased from 0.55 to 0.47. By the end of Correa's tenure, the 50% drop in the price of oil since 2014 had caused Ecuador's economy to enter a recession, resulting in government spending being slashed.

On 3 July 2018, a judge in Ecuador ordered a warrant for the arrest of Correa after he failed to appear in court during a trial surrounding the kidnapping of his political opponent Fernando Balda. Correa, who lived in Belgium at the time, denied the allegations regarding the kidnapping. In July 2018 Interpol rejected an Ecuador-issued arrest warrant and called it "obviously a political matter." In April 2020 the Criminal Court of the National Court of Justice found the former president guilty of aggravated passive bribery in the Caso Sobornos 2012-2016. He was sentenced in absentia to 8 years in prison.

Early life

Childhood 
Correa's father was Rafael Correa Icaza, born in the Province of Los Ríos, Ecuador, (23 March 1934 – 10 June 1995) while his mother is Norma Delgado Rendón (born 1 September 1939). He had three siblings; Fabricio Correa, Pierina Correa and Bernardita Correa. Having grown up in the coastal city of Guayaquil, he has described his family background as being that of the "lower middle class".

When Correa was five, his father was arrested and imprisoned for three years after attempting to smuggle illegal narcotics into the United States. Publicly acknowledging this incident while president, Correa stated that "I do not condone what he did [but] drug smugglers are not criminals. They are single mothers or unemployed people who are desperate to feed their families". Correa was 18 when he was told about his father's actions.

While living in Guayaquil, Correa was highly involved in the Boy Scout program. When he was 17, despite his family facing financial hardship, a family friend was paid for him to be educated at an elite local school, where he excelled. During his secondary studies he was president of the Lasallian Student Cultural Association ("ACEL" in Spanish). Correa then obtained a scholarship to study at the Catholic University of Santiago de Guayaquil (UCSG), a private higher education institution in Guayaquil, Ecuador, where he obtained an undergraduate degree in economics in 1987.

When attending UCSG, he was elected President of the Association of Students of Economy, Audit and Administration (AEAA) and, later on, President of the Federation of Students (FEUC) of the same education center, a position which in 1986 allowed him to preside over the Private Universities Students Federation of Ecuador (FEUPE in Spanish).

University 

Following the conclusion of his studies at UCSG, Correa worked for a year in a mission at a kindergarten run by the Salesian order in Zumbahua, Cotopaxi Province, where he taught Catholicism and mathematics. It was here that he furthered his faith in Catholicism, and developed a working understanding of the Quechua language spoken by most of Ecuador's indigenous people. He then secured a scholarship to study economics further at UCLouvain in Belgium, where he met Anne Malherbe Gosselin, whom he married and has three children with. He later received a Master of Arts in Economics from UCLouvain in June 1991.

Correa was able to afford a university education with the aid of funding grants. He continued his studies at the University of Illinois at Urbana-Champaign, where he earned a Master of Science in economics in May 1999, and a PhD in economics in October 2001.

Returning to Ecuador, Correa secured a position at the University of San Francisco in Quito, where he taught economics. At the same time, he worked as an economic adviser to state and international agencies. During this period, Ecuador experienced a banking crisis and the government of President Jamil Mahuad replaced the Ecuadorean sucre currency with the U.S. dollar. Correa was highly critical of this dollarisation policy, arguing against it in various academic publications that he produced at the time.

Politics
Between 1992 and 1993, during the presidency of Sixto Durán Ballén, Correa was a director at the Ministry of Education and Culture (MEC) in Ecuador, tasked with administrative oversight and supervision of improvement programs for the national educational system. The improvement programs were funded by the Inter-American Development Bank (IDB).

Minister of Finance 
On 20 April  2005, Correa was appointed to the position of Minister of Economy and Finance in the government of President Alfredo Palacio, having previously advised Palacio before his ascension to the presidency. As finance minister, Correa met with a number of Latin American presidents, including Brazil's Luiz Inácio Lula da Silva, Argentina's Nestor Kirchner, and Venezuela's Hugo Chávez. He established himself as both a political maverick and a staunch critic of economic liberalization.

During his four months in charge of the portfolio, Correa was skeptical of signing a free trade agreement with the United States and declining advice from the International Monetary Fund, instead working to increase Ecuador's cooperation with other Latin American countries. Arguably his most notable decision within the Ministry of Finance was to reverse the fact that surpluses from oil sales go directly to prepay Ecuador's foreign debt and instead go to investment in health and education. After the World Bank stopped a loan, citing changes in the oil revenue stabilization fund, Correa resigned from Palacio's government. He had also proposed the issuance of government bonds at a lower interest rate than the 8.5% prevailing one at that time. Venezuela's government was buying half of the new bond issue. Correa claimed in his resignation letter that the sale was done with full presidential authorization, but cited lack of support from the president as a factor in his decision to resign. When Correa resigned as minister, polls showed he had the highest credibility of any official in the administration at the time, with 57% of Ecuadorians saying that they trusted him.

Prior to becoming President, Correa denounced the "sophistry of Free Trade", in an introduction he wrote for a book titled The Hidden Face of Free Trade Agreements. One of the authors of that book is his ex-Minister and congressman Alberto Acosta. Citing as his source the book, Kicking Away the Ladder, written by Korean economist based at Cambridge University and Center for Economic and Policy Research analyst Ha-Joon Chang, Correa identified the difference between an "American system" opposed to "a British System" of free trade. The latter, he says, was explicitly viewed by the Americans as "part of the British imperialist system". Correa wrote that Chang showed that it was Treasury Secretary Alexander Hamilton, and not Friedrich List who was the first to present a systematic argument defending industrial protectionism. (Correa includes List's National System of Political Economy in his bibliographic references.)

2006 presidential campaign 
Correa decided to campaign for the presidency in the 2006 presidential election, although at the time he was a largely unknown figure among the Ecuadorean public. Employing Vinicio Alvarado as his campaign manager, Correa's campaign emphasised his personality as a macho family man of modest origins who was angry with the country's political elites. During his campaign, he described himself as the head of "a citizen's revolution" against the established political parties and corrupt elites, and depicted himself as the leader of a second independence movement devoted to freeing Ecuador from American imperialism. Touring the country aboard a motorized caravan attending political rallies, he emphasized this opposition using campaign songs such as Twisted Sister's "We're Not Gonna Take It", as well as through the slogan "Se viene el correazo" ("Here comes a whipping"), a pun on the fact that "Correa" can be translated as whip.

Correa established a political vehicle, the PAIS Alliance (Alianza PAIS—Patria Altiva y Soberana, "Proud and Sovereign Fatherland Alliance"), which united a disparate group of leftist organizations. However, in an unusual move he announced that the PAIS Alliance would not put forward any congressional candidates during the election, thus reflecting his opposition to the established political system. During the campaign, Correa stated that if elected he would use an executive decree to introduce a national referendum on the establishment of a constituent assembly which had the potential to rewrite Ecuador's constitution. He presented this as a process necessary to overthrow the established political elites, whom he termed the partidocracia ("partyarchy"), and redistribute political power.

The Alianza PAIS movement signed a political alliance with the Ecuadorian Socialist Party, which did present candidates for Congress. On 31 July 2006, Alianza PAIS also signed a Programmatic Political Agreement with the Communist Party of Ecuador when Correa was postulated for candidate for president. Other parties that joined Alianza PAIS coalition in a runoff election included Democratic People's Movement, Democratic Left, Pachakutik, and the Partido Roldista Ecuatoriano.

During his campaign, Correa traveled to Barinas, Venezuela to spend time at Hugo Chávez's family home, describing the Venezuelan President as a personal friend.

On economic policy, Correa called for reform of the petroleum industry, including an increase in the percentage of petroleum revenues spent on social programs for the Ecuadorian poor, following the reforms of the Hydrocarbons Law promoted by former Economy and Finance Minister Diego Borja. He accused foreign petroleum companies operating in Ecuador of failing to meet existing environmental and investment regulations.

In an interview, Correa stated:

Many of the oil contracts are a true entrapment for the country. Of every five barrels of oil that the multinationals produce, they leave only one for the state and take four... That is absolutely unacceptable. We're going to revise and renegotiate the contracts."

Correa also proposed strategies for reducing the burden of Ecuador's foreign debt service through compulsory debt restructuring. He indicated that his top priority would be spending on social programs rather than servicing Ecuador's debt. On foreign policy, Correa stressed Ecuador's aversion to becoming involved in Colombia's domestic conflict. In October 2006, Correa added that he would "pursue and capture" FARC members if they entered Ecuador. He also condemned their kidnappings, violations of human rights and bombings. In addition to his platform on economic and social policy, Correa's ability to communicate with a large majority of Ecuador's indigenous population in their own language also differentiated him from other candidates. He learned Quichua in his youth during a year he spent volunteering in a remote highland town.

In the October 2006 general election, Correa obtained second place (23%) behind banana tycoon Álvaro Noboa (27%). The situation led to a run-off election, in which Correa portrayed Noboa as an exploitative oligarch and Noboa portrayed Correa as a dangerous leftist with strong links to Venezuela. Correa won the subsequent November 2006 runoff election with 57% of the vote.

Presidency

First term: 2007–2009 

Rafael Correa was officially declared President on 4 December 2006 by the electoral court. He was sworn in on 15 January 2007 as the 56th president of Ecuador, the seventh to occupy the post since the legislature removed President Abdalá Bucaram 10 years earlier in the midst of a debt crisis that had devastated the country. His inauguration was attended by most regional leaders, as well as the Iranian president and the Spanish Crown Prince. Declaring that "Ecuador had voted for itself", Correa proclaimed that his election meant an end to neoliberalism in the country. Invoking the name of African-American civil rights activist Martin Luther King Jr., Correa also spoke out against racial discrimination against indigenous and Afro-Ecuadorians in his speech. During the ceremony he wore a shirt decorated with motifs from the prehistoric Jama Coaque culture.

During his first months in office, Correa's government doubled the monthly poverty assistance payments to $30, doubled the credits for housing loans and reduced the electricity rates for individuals on low incomes.

Correa ordered a plebiscite on the issue or whether or not Ecuador should establish a new constitution in April 2007; the proposal passed with over 80% of the vote. Elections to establish a Constituent Assembly were held in 2007 and were won by Correa's government with over 60% of the vote.
The new constitution also increased the powers of the presidency by increasing the number of presidential decrees permitted.

Economic policy 

Correa adopted a confrontational approach to both the International Monetary Fund and the World Bank.
Correa's administration stated that the new government would not sign an agreement which allowed the International Monetary Fund to monitor its economic plan. In February 2007, Correa's economy minister Ricardo Patiño stated: "I have no intention … of accepting what some governments in the past have accepted: that (the IMF) tell us what to do on economic policy ... That seems unacceptable to us". However, as a member of the IMF, the annual report known as the "Article IV" report will be submitted. In April 2007, paid off its debt to the IMF. Correa said Ecuador wanted no further relationship with the fund. During his first year in office, Correa spoke of building an alternative to capitalist development, stating “we are building a conception of development that is different from that of the capitalist system, where we seek not to live better, competition, to have more every day, but to live well, satisfy basic needs, where harmony with nature is sought, where seek the indefinite life of cultures.” This was reflected in an ideological manifesto of Correa's PAIS Alliance and various development plans, which promoted as an alternative to capitalism Buen Viver (Good Living). He declared Ecuador's national debt illegitimate and announced that the country would default on over $3 billion worth of bonds; he pledged to fight creditors in international courts and succeeded in reducing the price of outstanding bonds by more than 60%.

In May 2007, evidence surfaced that some of the Ecuadorian government rhetoric might have been part of an alleged market manipulation to benefit Ecuador from movements in the price of financial instruments linked to Ecuadorian bonds. A fall in Ecuador bond prices, ignited by aggressive default rhetoric, would trigger a buyback by Ecuador, financed by Venezuelan banks. This strategy collapsed due to operations by Venezuelan financial institutions who profited from the market swings. Correa referred to the allegations as a conspiracy from a powerful banker. On 26 July 2007, Rafael Correa replaced finance minister Patiño, due to Patiño's appearance in a video recording, apparently discussing the market manipulation. Patiño then assumed a newly created position responsible for the Pacific coast region and later assumed the Political Affairs Ministry. In a radio address on 13 December, Correa said that he wanted to force a "big discount" on creditors, whom a day earlier he called "true monsters who won't hesitate to crush the country". "I have lost sleep over this … this will cost us tears and sweat but I think we are doing the right thing." Correa, who endorses anti-debt NGO Jubilee 2000's slogan "life before debt", is popular among Ecuadorians for his stance against foreign investors.

Correa has criticized the neoliberal policies of previous presidents, particularly former president Mahuad's adoption of the U.S. dollar as Ecuador's domestic currency in 2000 to combat the country's inflation. Correa has characterized American dollarisation as a "technical error" which has effectively eliminated Ecuador's ability to set its own currency and exchange policy. However, Correa has also acknowledged that it would be politically and economically impossible to abandon that policy now. After his election victory of 15 April 2007, he pledged to maintain dollarisation during the entire four years of his administration, though he also indicated his support for the idea of replacing the US dollar with a regional South American currency at some point in the future.

On 16 April 2009, Finance Minister María Elsa Viteri embarked on a trip to Europe in a mission to present Ecuador's offer to buy back global bonds 2012 and 2030 at 30% of their current value. In May 2009, Ecuador announced that it had successfully bought 91% of the bonds at a cost of 35 cents on the dollar.

In May 2008, the Ecuadorian government renegotiated radio spectrum franchises for mobile phone operators Porta and Movistar for a total price of 700 million dollars, far more than that recommended by studies conducted under previous governments, which had proposed granting the same franchises for only 70 million dollars.

Foreign policy 

During Rafael Correa's tenure as president he took some radical alternative steps to change the course of Ecuador's relations with the rest of the world. Amongst these were economic moves to correct Ecuador's debt imbalance, distancing from the United States, a rift with its northern neighbor Colombia, and a strengthening of ties with ALBA (including Venezuela and Bolivia), as well as Iran.

Correa adopted a confrontational approach to the governments of both the United States and neighboring Colombia. At the time of his election, Ecuador contained Manta Air Base, the only U.S. military base in South America. Correa refused to renew the base's lease when it expired in 2009 and the constitution was changed to ban foreign military bases being established in Ecuador.

On 1 March 2008 at 00:25 local time (05:25 UTC), Colombia launched a military operation,  into Ecuador. According to Colombian authorities, the guerrillas responded militarily to this initial bombardment from a position in the vicinity of Santa Rosa de Yanamaru, on the Ecuadorian side of the border, killing a Colombian soldier, Carlos Hernández. A second bombardment was then carried out, resulting in the deaths of Raúl Reyes and at least 20 more FARC members. Two bodies, several documents and three laptops found in the guerrilla camp were returned to Colombia. This was the first time the Colombian military had killed a member of FARC's leadership council in combat. After this operation, Colombia increased its security measures nationwide, fearing FARC retaliation.

According to the Ecuadorian government, the attack happened  inside its own territory, lacked its permission and was a planned strike, intended to be followed by the incursion of Colombian troops by helicopter. It pointed out that the attack had left a total of more than 20 people dead in Ecuadorian territory, many of whom were found to be wearing underwear or sleeping clothes. The government of Ecuador concluded that the attack was a "massacre" and not the result of combat or "hot pursuit". Ecuadorian president Rafael Correa had reason to believe that the Colombian warplanes had penetrated 10 km into Ecuador's territory and struck the guerrilla camp while flying north, followed by troops in helicopters who had completed the killings. He claimed that some of the bodies had been found to be shot from behind.

The Ecuadorian authorities found three wounded women in the camp, including a Mexican student who was identified as Lucía Andrea Morett Álvarez. Lucía Morett claimed that she was visiting the guerrilla group as part of an academic investigation, refusing to answer other questions about the circumstances surrounding her presence there. Regarding the attack on the camp, she has stated: "I was asleep when we received a first aerial attack. Two or three hours later we were attacked again". Ecuador said that it was cooperating with Mexico to investigate whether any Mexicans had been killed during the raid. According to the director of the Ecuadorian military hospital which treated the three women, they had received some sort of medical attention from both the attacking Colombian forces and the Ecuadorian soldiers who later found them.

President Uribe of Colombia spoke by telephone with his Ecuadorian counterpart, Rafael Correa, early on the morning of the raid, to inform him of the incident. In a press conference that evening, Correa denounced the attack as "aggression" against Ecuador, calling it a "massacre", and claiming that the rebels had been killed in their sleep using "advanced technology". He announced that he was summoning his ambassador in Colombia for consultations. On Sunday, 2 March, Correa said that a diplomatic note would be sent in protest at the incursion, claiming that the action had been a violation of Ecuador's airspace. Ecuador formally recalled its ambassador from Colombia and expelled the Colombian ambassador from Quito.

Correa withdrew his government's ambassador in Bogotá, Colombia, and ordered troops to the country's border following the 2008 Andean diplomatic crisis in early March 2008. On 3 March 2008, Colombia's police said that documents found in a camp in Ecuador where Colombian troops killed Raul Reyes, a top guerrilla boss, showed ties between the FARC rebels and Correa, including contacts about political proposals and local military commanders. Correa denied the accusations, calling them lies. Correa also said that a deal to release political prisoners – including former Colombian Sen. Ingrid Betancourt – was nearly complete before the 1 March 2008 Colombian raid into his country. On 5 March 2008, Correa and Venezuelan president Hugo Chávez met to discuss Colombia's attack and made a series of accusations against Colombia's government. During the meeting, Correa dismissed Colombia's president Álvaro Uribe as just a "puppet" while others are the "puppet masters". On 18 May 2011, Colombia's Supreme Court ruled documents found on computers of slain FARC commander "Raul Reyes" are inadmissible as evidence in court as the material is illegally obtained and provides no evidence.

2008 Constitution

Relations with Congress and Legislative crisis 
In February 2007, Correa's plan to have a referendum on the convening of a constituent assembly was approved by Congress. The referendum took place on 15 April 2007. However, after this date was set, the "statutes" for the referendum were modified by Correa to allow more powers to the constituent assembly. One of these powers was the ability to dismiss Congress, a power which Congress never approved. The newer version of the referendum was approved by the majority of the seven-seat Electoral Tribunal. In early March, Congress, which was controlled by Correa's opposition, reacted by trying to impeach the President of the electoral tribunal. The electoral tribunal then removed from office the 57 members of Congress who tried to impeach the President of the Electoral Tribunal, on the grounds of attempting to intervene an electoral process. Correa backed the electoral tribunal (which approved his version of the referendum) while stating that the removal of the 57 congressmen was constitutional. The situation escalated to a feud between the opposition in Congress and the Executive and marches in the street against Congress and police intervention to prevent the Congressmen from entering the legislative building.

On 22 March, 21 alternate deputies were sworn in, allowing the Congress to regain quorum, and on 23 and 24 March a further 20 deputies were sworn in. The new majority (formed by 28 alternate deputies and 31 deputies from parties that support the referendum and Assembly) pledged to support the referendum on the Constitutional Assembly.

On 23 April, the Constitutional Court decided to try to reinstate 51 of the 57 Congressmen who had been fired by the Electoral Tribunal. The Constitutional Court claimed that it was illegal to remove them in the first place, and approved a petition by the 51 requesting their reinstatement. But before the congressmen had the chance to reenter Congress, Congress voted to fire all nine judges of the Constitutional Court for their "unconstitutional actions".

On 15 April 2007, Ecuadorians voted overwhelmingly (81.72% in favor) to support the election of a constituent assembly. On 30 September 2007, due to the extraordinarily large number of candidates and lists (26 national lists, 428 provincial lists, 44 emigrant lists) the 2007 Ecuadorian Constituent Assembly election was the most complex in Ecuador's history. As a result, in the national election, President Correa won backing for his plans to rewrite Ecuador's constitution and expand state control of the nation's economy. Correa's faction won approximately 61% of the seats in the National Assembly (80 of 130 Assembly Members).

Constituent Assembly 
The Ecuadorian Constituent Assembly first convened on 29 November 2007 in Montecristi, and was given six months to write a new constitution, with a possible two-month extension. When Ecuador began the process of writing a new constitution, they received help from the Community Environmental Legal Defense Fund to draft environmental laws giving nature and ecosystems rights.

A constitutional referendum was held in Ecuador on 28 September 2008 to ratify or reject the constitution drafted by the Ecuadorian Constituent Assembly elected in 2007. Partial results show that 64% of voters voted to approve the 2008 Constitution of Ecuador.

Environmental conservation 
The President affirmed that his was a "green" Government for its defense of the environment." In line with this, he had decided to return to the International Whaling Commission to impede the restart of the hunt of whales; established a prohibition on the extraction of prized types of wood; and announced that for an annual compensation of 350 million dollars from the international community it would give up the exploitation of an oil field with around 1,000 million barrels, one of their biggest reserves of petroleum located in a reservation of the Yasuní National Park biosphere in the Amazon Basin. The proposal hoped to collect contributions starting from 2010.

Oil politics 
In 2013 Ecuador announced that it would auction more than three million hectares of Amazonian rainforest in the Yasuni Nature Reserve to Chinese oil companies. The indigenous people inhabiting the land protested the deal. They claim that the oil projects would threaten their traditional way of life and devastate the area's environment. Ecuador's Shuar people's women's leader, Narcisa Mashienta, said that the government lied when claiming that the people would have given their consent.

The NGO Amazon Watch claims that the reason for the projects is the government's 7 billion dollar debt to China and the desire to get Chinese funding to build a 12.5 billion dollar oil refinery.

An 11,000-barrel oil spill in the Amazon was considered problematic to Correa's desire to win a third term, because he had tried to assure his critics of him being environment-friendly.

Yasuní-ITT Initiative 
Yasuní-ITT Initiative, The aim of the initiative is to provide a creative solution for the threat posed by the extraction of crude oil in the Ishpingo-Tiputini-Tambococha (ITT) oil fields, which are located in the highly vulnerable area of Yasuní National Park. The proposal would contribute to preserving biodiversity, reducing carbon dioxide emissions, and respecting the rights of indigenous peoples and their way of life.

President Correa has stated that Ecuador's first option is to maintain the crude oil in the subsoil. The national and international communities would be called on to help the government implement this costly decision for the country. The government hopes to recover 50% of the revenues it would obtain by extracting the oil. The procedure involves the issuing of government bonds for the crude oil that will remain "in situ", with the double commitment of never extracting this oil and of protecting Yasuní National Park. The hoped for-amount is estimated at 350 million dollars annually.

A more promising alternative would be a strategy to provide the government with the 50% of resources in such a way as to provide a consistent income for an indefinite period of time. This resource would be channeled towards activities that help to free the country from its dependency on exports and imports and to consolidate food sovereignty.

In August 2013, Correa abandoned the initiative and approved oil drilling, blaming lack of support from the international community for the decision.

Sea conservation 
Correa overturned a ban on the sale of shark fins, which are popular in Asia, but stipulated that the fins can only be sold if the sharks are caught accidentally and by artisan fishermen. He did not say how authorities would determine whether the shark had been caught accidentally or deliberately.

On 3 August 2007, Correa ordered the deportation of Sean O'Hearn-Gimenez, director of the Sea Shepherd Conservation Society, saying that he would not allow "gringuitos" (literally, "little gringos") to tell Ecuadorians what to do or to pursue local fishermen. However, a local newspaper noted that O'Hearn-Gimenez had signed a 5-year agreement with Ecuador's own Environmental Police rather than acting unilaterally (as a foreigner with no authority of his own), and was married to an Ecuadorian. The deportation was ordered because Sea Shepherd, in partnership with the Ecuadorian National Environmental Police, exposed and stopped the biggest shark-fin shipment in the port city of Manta. Correa later rescinded the extradition order because O'Hearn-Gimenez was married to an Ecuadorian woman. All the arrested fishermen were released, too, and the confiscated shark fins returned to them.

Security and defense 

In June and July 2007 in several communities of the Amazonía and domestic South, protests were carried out against oil and mining concessions to transnational companies (PetroChina, PetroBras and mining Canadian). According to some media, the Government repressed abusing from the force to these mobilizations.

Second presidential term: 2009–2013 
Rafael Correa was re-elected for a second term in the April 2009 general election, where he gained 52% of the vote. He was the first Ecuadorian President to serve a second consecutive term since the 19th century. It was the first time in thirty years that the country had re-elected a president and the first elected president from Guayaquil (The coast) who had finished his term after Leon Febres Cordero (1984–1986). He won by a large margin over the other seven candidates, taking 52 per cent of the vote to the 28 per cent of Lucio Gutiérrez, his nearest rival. His party also won the largest legislative block in the National Assembly, although not a majority.

Correa was sworn into the Presidency on 10 August 2009, the same day as Ecuador's bicentennial. His speech took place in front of several South American dignitaries, such as the president of Argentina Cristina Fernández de Kirchner, Bolivian President Evo Morales, Cuban President Raúl Castro, and Venezuelan President Hugo Chávez. Correa used the opportunity to promise a continuation of his "socialist revolution", his plans to end poverty and to go on "stamping out the structural causes of poverty". He also said the actions of the media were opposing his government. He claims that the continuation of his "The Citizens' Revolution" policy is intended to ensure all citizens are equal.

Health  

The health budget was $561 million in 2006 and was increased to $1,774 million in 2012, which is 6.8% of the national budget.] The Ecuadorian government signed an agreement with the Cuban government to allow public company Enfarma to massively produce medicine at low cost. Working hours for doctors were increased to 40 hours/week and their salaries were also increased. Mobile hospitals have been implemented. Another program has been implemented in order to increase the rate of return of medics amongst Ecuadorian emigrants.

Infant mortality, from 24.4 per 1000 in 2005, declined to 18.3 in 2015. Between 2008 and 2016, new public hospitals have been built, the number of civil servants has increased significantly and salaries have been increased. In 2008, the government introduced universal and compulsory social security coverage. In 2015, corruption remains a problem. Overbilling is recorded in 20% of public establishments and in 80% of private establishments.

Closure of Teleamazonas 
In June 2009, CONARTEL (a radio and television regulating body) imposed fines on a television station, Teleamazonas. A third fine could lead to a temporary or permanent ban on this private television channel. In December 2009, the station was taken off the air by the Superintendent of Telecommunications [es], under a provisional suspension of 72 hours for purportedly "spreading false information."

2009 Ecuador electricity crisis 

Beginning 5 November, rolling blackouts took place across Ecuador for two to six hours per day. Government officials also urged citizens to conserve energy. Economic losses from the blackouts are estimated to be in the tens of millions of dollars; factory output slowed, and storage of perishables was disrupted.

On 6 November, the government declared an emergency in the power sector, which was expected to "allow the Finance Ministry to seek to guarantee fuel imports for thermoelectric plants". The government also agreed to purchase an additional "5,200 MW per hour of electricity from Peru and Colombia". Government officials aimed to end power rationing before Christmas.

The power crisis led to criticism of the Correa administration's management of the power sector as water levels of the reservoirs became depleted.

Mining protests 
In January, Ecuador was shaken by mass protests against large-scale mining. Indigenous people were demanding that they not be exploited at all and were blockading highways to make their point. Correa cited a constitutional article that prohibited the blocking of roads. Police officers were also injured in attempting to clear blockades. Eye Witnesses leader claimed "The response from the government was gunfire from the ground and the air,"
The leader said that police, backed by a helicopter, opened fire on the protesters unprovoked.
In an interview with the state-run media on Thursday, Correa said that the police were not armed and had only riot gear to protect them from demonstrators who were wielding shotguns.
The Shuar man that died was killed by protesters' own weapons, and police were also injured by the same shotgun pellets that killed the brother Shuar, Correa said.

Hydrocarbon production reforms 
Correa announced that on Monday 26 July 2010 Ecuador would enact reforms to a hydrocarbons law that aims to expropriate foreign-company operations unless they sign service contracts increasing state control of the industry. Correa reminded oil companies that if they did not abide by the state's policies, they would have their fields nationalized and would be forced from the country.

Higher Education Law 
A debate to modify this and other reforms, especially the one which granted control of the Higher Education System by the government, was practically passed with consensus by the multi-partisan National Assembly on 4 August 2010 but vetoed by the president Rafael Correa, who wanted to keep the law strictly as it was originally redacted by his political party and SENPLADES (National Secretary of Planning and Development). Due to this change, there are many highly educated professionals and academicians under the old structure but estimated that only 87% of the faculty in public universities have already obtained a master's degree and fewer than 5% have PhD (although many of them have already Ecuadorian granted Doctorate degrees). In order to raise the number of Masters and PhDs the Government started a scholarship program to send Ecuadorians to study in the top ranking Universities around the world (around 8.500 scholarships until 2013) and around 820 more have been approved for 2014.

2010 Ecuador crisis 

On 30 September 2010, the National Police went on strike over the passage of a bill that would end the practice of giving medals and bonuses with each promotion. In what was called an attempted coup d'état, protests included road blockades, storming the National Assembly and state-run television station, and the military seizure of the Old Mariscal Sucre International Airport in Quito. President Correa went to debate with the rebellious police, but he was unsuccessful and instead challenged them to kill him, saying, "I'm not taking one step back. Gentlemen, if you want to kill the president, here he is, kill him if you have the guts." At this point none of the policemen dared to shoot him, so instead they decided to attack him and take him hostage. While held in the hospital inside the police headquarters, Correa declared a national state of emergency. That night, an elite army unit rescued him from the hospital amid violent clashes between the police and the army. The Army then took him to Carondelet Palace, where he announced he would not pardon those responsible. Throughout Ecuador, eight people were killed and 274 wounded in the unrest.

On the same night, eight South American presidents attended an emergency summit of UNASUR convened that night in Buenos Aires to express their full support for Ecuadorean democratic institutions and Rafael Correa. The summit also announced a "democratic clause" to the UNASUR Constitutive Treaty and an agreement to take immediate and concrete steps if further similar attempts should occur.

The United States declared support for Correa through its ambassador to the Organization of American States. U.S. Secretary of State Hillary Clinton expressed "full support for President Rafael Correa, and the institutions of democratic government in that country." On 5 October, Ecuadorian foreign minister Ricardo Patiño said "I firmly believe that Mr. Obama had nothing to do with this. I hope, and trust that neither his (immediate subordinates) did.

President of UNASUR 
Correa was a signatory to The UNASUR Constitutive Treaty of the Union of South American Nations on 15 July 2009. Ecuador has ratified the treaty. According to treaty, the UNASUR headquarters will be located in Ecuador.

On 10 August 2009 Correa hosted the Heads of Government of South America in Quito, as he took over the one year Pro Tempore Presidency of UNASUR. Correa announced on 3 April 2010 that he would propose to UNASUR the creation of a united front against transnationals like the American Chevron, which he accused of attempting to destroy his country.

Correa also asked that UNASUR create a commission to investigate the events that led to the 30 Sep police revolt in Ecuador in which about a dozen people died and 270 were wounded. The uprising was led by police upset over a new law that would deny them promotion bonuses.

During Friday's summit, leaders also approved a democratic charter that would serve as a guide for the 12-nation bloc if any of them faced an attempted coup. The charter would have been an effective tool during Ecuador's revolt, Correa said. On 29 November 2010, UNASUR's presidency passed from Ecuador to Guyana.

In 2014, Correa opened the $65 million UNASUR headquarters in Quito.

Lawsuit against the El Universo newspaper and Big Brother authors 
Correa announced another lawsuit this time against an editorial writer and the directors of El Universo newspaper. The legal action included the opinion editor of the paper, Emilio Palacio, who was sued for defamation by a high-ranking public official last year. Correa alleged that several of Palacio's editorials were "accusations" and "slander", where Palacio stated "...ordered fire at will and without warning against a hospital full of civilians and innocent people..." In an official Universo editorial it was said that Correa committed crimes against humanity reasons, which Palacio was sued for. El Universo says the president's suit was announced several hours after the newspaper published an article about an information access request denial. While Palacio claimed, he was sued for calling Correa a "dictator".

"We are not only suing the editorial writer, but also the newspaper El Universo's directors", said Correa, in a radio interview on Ecuadorinmediato, quoted by El Universo. "Ecuador's autocrat cracks down on media freedom," was the title of an editorial published by The Washington Post on 27 July 2011:

Last week the president personally attended the trial while thuggish supporters threw eggs and bottles at the defendants outside the courthouse. To no one's surprise, the provisional judge hearing the case quickly ruled in the president's favor, sentencing Mr. Palacio and the three El Universo directors to three years in prison and awarding $40 million in damages to Mr. Correa – an amount that exceeds the total value of the newspaper. As of 16 February 2012, the National Court of Justice (Ecuador's highest court) confirmed the lower court's award of $40 million in damages, as well as the three-year prison sentences against a journalist and three executives of the newspaper. The case related to unrest in September 2010, described by Mr Correa as an attempted coup, which saw him trapped inside a hospital for several hours by police officers. In an opinion article from February 2011 which appeared in El Universo, Emilio Palacio alleged that the president had ordered soldiers to fire on the hospital, which was full of civilians.

Correa also filed a lawsuit against Juan Carlos Calderón and Christian Zurita, investigative journalists and authors of the book "Gran Hermano" (Big Brother). Rafael Correa insisted that if the authors of the book admitted wrongdoing and asked for forgiveness he would pardon them. The lawsuit is based on the book's accusation that Correa knew of his brother Fabricio Correa's multimillion-dollar contracts with the government, a journalistic "investigation" into contracts signed between the president's brother, Fabricio Correa, and the State. The authors claim was based on a testimony by Pablo Chambers, who based his accusation on a manipulated video of Correa during an interview with a radio station in Quito.

Following wide condemnation of the sentences in the El Universo case, Correa announced on 27 February 2012 that he would pardon the four individuals involved, also reminding that from the very beginning he asked for a rectification by the newspaper or an apology, both which the newspaper refused, instead claiming this was censorship, including asking Correa what he wanted them to publish. Despite the subsequent pardons, "the lawsuit had," according to Steven Levitsky and Daniel Ziblatt, "a powerful chilling effect on the press."

Correa also said he would drop his case against the authors of "Gran Hermano".

Correa has been accused, in the words of the President of the Inter-American Press Association, of mounting a "systematic and hostile campaign to do away with the independent press and establish, by law or through the courts, ownership of the truth that all the Ecuadoran people must swallow." These complaints relate both to a series of lawsuits against journalists and to government takeovers of many media outlets.

The Washington Post reported in July 2011 that, according to a report for the National Endowment for Democracy, the government had controlled one radio station when Mr. Correa became president in 2007, but that by the time of the report it owned five television channels, four radio stations, two newspapers and four magazines.

Ecuadorian constitutional referendum, 2011 
Correa announced a constitutional referendum, which took place on 7 May 2011. The Ecuadorian people were asked to vote on ten questions, including a reform of the judiciary, although opposition members denounceid what they called a "power grab" on behalf of Correa's government. Although an exit poll conducted by the Santiago Perez pollster showed that the 10 questions won with the 62% of the votes, as the count continued the "yes" lost presence even going as far as slightly losing to the "no" for a short period of time in questions 4 and 9. Correa pledged that the data had been manipulated by counting first the votes from the provinces where the "no" have won to create the "sensation of fraud" and he predicted that the "yes" will win with at least 250.000 votes on all 10 questions. At the end the "yes" won all 10 questions but only the first question got more than the 50% of the votes This was the eighth election to pass during Correa's term in office.

Chinese credits 
In 2010 and 2011, Ecuador received Chinese credits for around US$5 billion. One of this financing model's projects is the hydroelectric Coca Codo Sinclair that China builds and it finances with something more than US$2 billion.

Correa pointed out that China gives credits to Ecuador at 7.0 percent, but the credits are to finance projects with 23 or 25 percent of profitability, that is extremely good business, when referring to two thousand million dollars which will be dedicated to public investment initiatives. The Chinese credits are a "good business" with interests of 7 percent to finance projects with a profitability that goes from 23 to 25 percent. Correa discarded the idea that Ecuador is delivered to or have mortgaged its petroleum to China.

On this point he mentioned that in the year 2006 75% of the Ecuadorian petroleum went to United States, in exchange for nothing. "Now we have 50% of the committed petroleum with China, in exchange for thousands of millions of dollars to finance the development of this country.

In 2012, China loaned Ecuador 240 million dollars for the purpose of overhauling the Ecuadorian security system. This system comprises 4,300 new surveillance cameras, drones, automated evidence processing systems, and increased manpower to manage each of these new technologies, which have been collectively dubbed the ECU 911 Integrated Security Service. Much of this new hardware has been developed in Ecuador, but in laboratories designed and set up by China National Electronics Import and Export Corporation (CEIEC), which is a state-owned company and a subsidiary of national defence contractor China Electronics Corporation (CEC). The CEC has also undertaken similar surveillance overhauls in Venezuela and Bolivia, and has also introduced technology to monitor the Amazon Rainforest in Brazil. The Ecuadorian government has highlighted the benefits of this extensive security system, which has been installed across the nation's 24 provinces. They argue that it has been able to decrease the response time for everyday emergencies such as life-threatening illness, and have cited the system as a large factor in the dramatic drop in crime in Ecuador since its installation. Some individuals have expressed concern about the nature and the pervasiveness of these technologies, however, and how they may be used to create an Ecuadorian police state.

Restructuring of the justice 
After the results of the popular consultation was created the Council of the Transitory Judicature integrated by three members Tania Aryans (delegate of the Legislative), Paulo Rodríguez (delegate of the Executive) and Fernando Yávar (delegate of the Function of Transparency). This advice has 18 months to restructure the Judicial Function Among its functions it was the one of creating the new National Court of Justice whose possession was given January 2012, 21 whose members will be in the positions for nine years. The court of justice was created through a competition of merits and opposition. Correa who participated of the act of possession of the new domestic magistrates, said that the administration of justice is an imperium of the state and at the same time, it is a public service, also it expressed his total back to the new judges of the National Court of Justice (CNJ)

In 2014, the law is amended to allow same-sex unions to benefit from legal recognition.

2012 Ecuadorian protests 

Ecuador's largest advocacy group for Indians, the Confederation of Indigenous Nationalities of Ecuador, planned a two-week march to Quito beginning on Thursday to protest Correa's land and water policies that they say were hurting their way of life. Correa condemned the action and accused them of being hypocrites for having allied with the extreme right, of seeking to exploit mining for themselves and of trying to destabilize his government, urging his followers to mobilize against them. The Indians were supported by the Popular Democratic Movement, a leftist party, the National Union of Educators and CONAIE, which supported Correa at the start of his administration in 2007 but soon moved to the opposition.

The support march on the Government concentrated on thousands of demonstrators coming from different zones that met in a park where they enjoyed artistic shows put on to celebrate the Woman's International Day. The march began in an Amazon region to the southeast and it arrived in Quito on 22 March. It had the support of the teachers' organizations and students.

Correa declared that the protests were intended to destabilize his government and he encouraged his followers "to keep mobilized until March 22"... "to resist peacefully. Those in favor of the Government also announced countermarches in various localities, such as in Cuenca where they had a concentration that gathered around fifteen thousand people.

Sex education and contraceptive services 
Correa established the National Interagency Strategy for Family Planning and the Prevention of Teen Pregnancies (ENIPLA) in 2011. It had an annual budget of $2 million and focused on preventive doctor visits and family planning, including access to the morning-after pill. In the four years since ENIPLA was established pregnancies amongst women between the ages of 11 and 14 decreased by 18 percent. At the end of 2014 Correa replaced ENIPLA with Plan Familia (a family-based abstinence only program). One study found that this shift led to an increase in teenage pregnancy in Ecuador.

CIA
Correa alleged that the United States attempted to meddle in the country's affairs during his presidency, saying that a representative from the American Central Intelligence Agency requested a meeting with him at the start of his administration and that the accounts of senior state officials had been hacked. Former British diplomat Craig Murray claimed that the CIA had tripled its budget to destabilise Rafael Correa's government during 2012.

Third presidential term: 2013–2017 

General elections were held in Ecuador on 17 February 2013 to elect the President, the National Assembly, Provincial Assemblies and members of the Andean Parliament. Correa was reelected president, winning by a large margin in the first round of the presidential election. According to the quick count released by Participación Ciudadana, the Alianza PAIS movement (AP) reached two-thirds of the new National Assembly. The results gave the movement 100 of the 137 seats contested in the polls. Correa's closest electoral rival, Guillermo Lasso (with 11 of the 137 seats in the new National Assembly), conceded shortly after the election concluded.

The Ministry of Telecommunication and Information Society won the WSIS 2013 prize in category C5: Building confidence and security in the use of ICTs with the project Digital Training through Mobile Classrooms

Economy 
Correa's government accepted a US$364 million loan from the IMF for earthquake reconstruction.

Between 2007 and 2014, poverty decreased from 36.7% to 22.5%. At the same time, inequalities, as measured by the Gini index, decreased from 0.55 to 0.47. Between 2006 and 2016, poverty decreased from 36.7% to 22.5% and annual per capita GDP growth was 1.5 percent (as compared to 0.6 percent over the prior two decades).

People with disabilities 
According to The Guardian, Ecuador has become one of the most progressive nations in Latin America when it comes to providing financial, technical and professional assistance to people with disabilities. State spending on related fields has increased from $2m a year to $150m. Tests are carried out on newborns to ensure care is provided early, and all leading employers in Ecuador must earmark at least 4% of their jobs for disabled people. There are also programmes to provide braille texts and computers for visually impaired people.

Foreign policy 
In November 2013, Correa's government said that the United States Agency for International Development was supporting the opposition and asked it to end its activities in Ecuador.

In April 2014, Correa's government ordered all US Defence Department employees working in the US embassy out of the country. Correa had previously stated that the US had too many military officers in Ecuador and that they had "infiltrated ... all sectors" of the country.

Police and crime 

The homicide rate per 100,000 inhabitants fell from 18 in 2011 to 5.8 in 2017, making Ecuador one of the safest countries in the Americas. This was achieved in part after a thorough reform of the police force, which was known for its corruption and inefficiency. The length of police training and their salaries have been significantly increased, and investments have been made to modernize equipment. In addition, since 2007, a new approach has been adopted that is less repressive and gives greater attention to prevention and reintegration. Access to social programs has been facilitated for ex-offenders. Above all, the reduction of poverty seems to be the main reason for the improvement of the security situation.

Post-presidency 
After finishing his term, Correa maintained an active position in national politics expressing his opinion on the situation of the country and the performance of Lenín Moreno's government through articles and editorials in the newspaper El Telégrafo, as well as in its social networks in which he issued several pronouncements on several similar topics.

Within months of winning the elections, President Moreno began to move away from his election platform, igniting a feud with Correa.

Correa led "No" campaign the during the 2018 Ecuadorian referendum and popular consultation.

Since 2018, Correa has hosted the weekly political talk show, Conversation with Correa, on RT Spanish.

On 3 July 2018, a judge in Ecuador ordered the arrest of Correa after he failed to appear in court during a trial surrounding the kidnapping of his political opponent Fernando Balda. Correa, who lived in Belgium at the time, denied the allegations regarding the kidnapping.

Correa's trial in absentia, on charges of bribery, began on 10 February 2020. On 7 April 2020, The Criminal Court of the National Court of Justice found the former president guilty of aggravated passive bribery in the :es:Caso Sobornos 2012-2016. He was sentenced to 8 years in prison for leading the corruption network that, between 2012 and 2016, received "undue contributions" at the Carondelet Palace to finance his political movement in exchange for awarding state contracts to businessmen, along with former Judiciary Secretary of the Presidency Alexis Mera, former Ministry of Housing and Urban Development María de los Angeles Duarte, former congresswoman Viviana Bonilla, and former Constitutional Judge—and his secretary—Pamela Martínez.

Moreno's government made three separate requests to Interpol to arrest Correa. Interpol rejected each request on human rights grounds.

Arrest of Julian Assange 
Correa maintained his support for Australian activist Julian Assange throughout his post-presidential life. On 11 April 2019, Rafael Correa's successor withdrew Assange's asylum and invited Scotland Yard into its embassy to arrest Assange. In response Correa called Moreno a traitor and said "Moreno is a corrupt man, but what he has done is a crime that humanity will never forget". Correa's Facebook account, which had more than 1.5 million followers, was blocked on 11 April 2019 for disclosing personal data. Correa had been using his Facebook account since March to publish details of the "INA Papers" case involving a company linked to Lenin Moreno's family.

Controversy

Relationship with the media 
Correa was highly critical of the Ecuadorian press. Accusing the press of lying and slandering him, he proposed a law that would ban those working in the financial sector from financing media outlets. Paraphrasing Tony Blair, he stated that the Ecuadorian press acted as "a group of wild beasts". He has also regularly criticized it as "...mediocre, incompetent, inaccurate, lying and is a part of the structure of corruption and accomplice of the national disaster." The US State Department noted "There is more than a grain of truth in Correa's observation that the Ecuadorian media play a political role, in this case the role of the opposition", further adding that the news outlets are owned by wealthy elites who see his economic reforms as a threat to their own position.

Correa has criticized several newspapers as El Universo, El Comercio, Diario Hoy, Diario Expreso, La Hora, calling them "news mafias" for criticising the ruling of the Electoral Tribunal depriving 57 opposition legislators of their seats in Congress. Correa argued that the press had remained silent about the holdups that had occurred in state-owned enterprises like Pacifictel and the Ecuadorian Customs Administration (CAE).

On 10 May 2007, Correa filed a lawsuit against Francisco Vivanco Riofrío of the board of directors of the Quito-based La Hora newspaper, over an editorial published in the paper on 9 March. The editorial, titled "Official Vandalism", said that Correa intended to rule Ecuador "with turmoil, rocks and sticks". It described the president's behavior as "shameful." Correa's suit is based on Article 230 of the country's penal code that sets prison penalties of up to two years for contempt, expressed in "threats or libel that would offend the president."

The Inter American Press Association (IAPA) has declared that it is "a clumsy step on the part of the Ecuadorean president to file a criminal charge against a news outlet, accusing it of contempt, an archaic concept in a modern democracy and outmoded in Latin America and which should be eliminated from penal codes, as the IAPA has been insisting." The Committee to Protect Journalists has also protested against the lawsuit: "Fear of criminal penalties will inhibit the Ecuadoran press in reporting and commenting on issues of public interest. We call on President Correa to drop the libel suit against Vivanco and repeal defamation laws that contradict international standards on freedom of expression".

In August 2007 he signed Ecuador to TeleSUR. Correa decided to create Ecuador TV, the first state-owned channel in the country, with the announced intention of producing television with better quality standards than the private channels. Also, newspaper El Telegrafo was purchased and became state-owned. Radio Pública, El Ciudadano, ANDES and PP were also created under Correa's presidency and are administered by state agencies.

Correa has also revealed the real identities of a number of his social media-based critics which has led to the individuals concerned being harassed. On 1 May 2015, Correa stopped his motorcade in downtown Quito to berate 17-year-old teenager Luis Carrera, after he spotted Carrera gave the middle finger gesture at Correa. Carrera was later sentenced to 20 hours of community service.

Edward Snowden 
In June 2013, US Senator Robert Menendez, chairman of the foreign relations panel, warned Ecuador that accepting PRISM leaker Edward Snowden "would severely jeopardize" preferential trade access the United States provides to Ecuador. "Our government will not reward countries for bad behavior."

President Correa responded by offering a multimillion-dollar donation for human rights training in the United States. "Ecuador offers the United States economic aid of US$23 million annually, similar to what we received with the trade benefits, with the intention of providing education about human rights", said a government spokesman. "Ecuador does not accept pressure or threats from anyone, nor does it trade with principles or submit them to mercantile interests, however important those may be."

Ecuador, which had originally issued Snowden a temporary travel document through its embassy in London, withdrew it because it did not meet the requirements of being in an Ecuadorian Embassy at that time. Snowden said that having the document gave him "the confidence, the courage to get on that plane to begin the journey" and that "there are few world leaders who would risk standing for the human rights of an individual against the most powerful government on earth, and the bravery of Ecuador and its people is an example to the world". President Correa said that, although he respected the decision of the London consul Fidel Narváez to issue it, the document was invalid.

Odebrecht scandal 

The Ecuadorean government continues to investigate the allegations of corruption in the country by Brazil's largest construction company. Ecuadorean officials announced that the Brazilian construction company Odebrecht will not be able to sign any future contracts with public institutions in Ecuador, as authorities continue to investigate alleged corruption in its operations. According to Geovanny Vicente Romero, a political analyst, "Ecuador is in the midst of presidential elections and its lame-duck president Rafael Correa wants to leave the house in order for his successor by taking a position in favor of investigating the Odebrecht case. Correa recently complained that though there were $33.5 million in bribes paid in Ecuador, the individuals involved in the case remain unknown". Some Ecuadorians had grown disenchanted with corruption, as well as Correa's confrontational and polarizing behavior towards media organizations. However, according to Transparency International, corruption decreased under Correa's government.

Response to the drop in oil prices 
In 2014, the price for crude oil, which was Ecuador's main export, began moving downward, from $111 dollars per barrel in June 2014, to $50 dollars per barrel in March 2015. To replace the lost revenue, Correa proposed raising taxes, including an increase of up to 75% in capital gain (Ley de Plusvalia), and a tax on inheritances from 2.5% up to 77.5% (the highest for inheritances of over $849,600 dollars).

Kidnapping allegations 
On 18 June 2018, Ecuador's highest court ordered the former President be included in an investigation into a 2012 botched kidnapping of opposition lawmaker Fernando Balda. After Correa ignored judicial orders and did not assist with the investigation, an Ecuadorian judge ordered for his arrest on 3 July 2018. The judge alerted Interpol because Correa was living in Belgium at the time with his wife, who was a Belgian native. Correa denied the allegations surrounding the kidnapping. In July 2018 Interpol rejected an Ecuador-issued arrest warrant and called it "obviously a political matter."

Public image and personal life 

According to the Cedatos, Correa began his presidency with a 73 percent approval rating.
An opinion poll carried out by Profiles of Opinion in the cities of Quito and Guayaquil, in March 2012 indicates that 80.5% of those interviewed categorize President Correa's administration as positive.
According to the Mitofsky of April 2012, as regards the "approval of leaders in America and the world", President Correa possesses an excellent evaluation. His popularity even increased from 75% to 81% from August 2011 to January 2012.
According to the Mitofsky of April 2013, as regards the "approval of leaders in America and the world", President Correa possessed a positive evaluation of 90%. However, his public image in Ecuador was heavily deteriorated after several controversial regulations during his later years as president. Approval ratings for Rafael Correa slipped from 60% in January 2015 to 45% in July 2015. Correa leaves office with a rate of 46%, according to a latest survey by the firm Cedatos.

Correa is Catholic, and while President, kept a photograph of the Pope on his desk.

Political ideology 

Correa describes himself as an advocate of "socialism of the 21st century". The Economist described Correa as "a left-wing populist", while The Washington Post has characterized Correa's ideological approach as being "economically populist, socially conservative, [and] quasi-authoritarian". The scholars of political science George Philip and Francisco Panizza claimed that like his allies Morales and Chávez, Correa should be categorized as a populist, because he appealed "directly to the people against their countries' political and economic order, divided the social field into antagonistic camps and promised redistribution and recognition in a newly founded political order."

Correa's actions vis-a-vis indigenous communities, however, were described as not populist. To protect Chinese mining interests, "Shuar lands are now under occupation by 8,000 military personnel - marine, air and land troops - equipped with four war-tanks, surveillance drones, aerostatic balloons, mobile satellites and helicopter gunships."

On 23 May 2013, Correa reiterated his opposition to same-sex marriage.

Honours and awards

Recognition 
Rafael Correa has been also awarded with:
 Conquering Insignia of Tarqui, Grand Cross of the Armed forces of Ecuador – in gratitude for the administration carried out for the benefit of the soldiers of the Homeland. 
 Order Great Marshal of Ayacucho of Venezuela – for the Bolivarian character of his administration in Ecuador, February 2009. 
 Medal of Honor in the Grade of Grand Cross –highest honour of the Congress of Peru, 12 June 2010. 
 Great Necklace of the Ecuadorian Federation of Soccer – in November 2010 in gratitude for the expedition of the Law of the Sport. 
 Medal of "Distinguished Visitor" – awarded by the UCSG in the inauguration of the III International University Congress, Development and Cooperation. 
 Highest honour of the Association of retired Generals of the National Police – for having brought about the approval of pensions to almost 20,000 former uniformed officers.

Honorary degrees 
: University of Chile Honorary doctorate, 11 March 2008.
: Universidad Nacional de Asunción Honorary doctorate, 24 March 2009.
: Moscow State Institute of International Relations Honorary doctorate, 30 October 2009.
: Ural State University Honorary doctorate, 30 October 2009.
: University of Buenos Aires Honorary doctorate, 3 December 2010.
: Universidad Autónoma de Santo Domingo Honorary doctorate in Economic and Social Sciences, 23 April 2010.
: University of Chiclayo Honorary doctorate, 28 February 2012.
: Bahçeşehir University Honorary doctorate, 16 March 2012.
: People's Friendship University of Russia Honorary doctorate, 30 October 2013.
: Universitat de Barcelona Honorary doctorate, 23 April 2014.
: University of Santiago, Chile Honorary doctorate, 2014.
: National University of Córdoba Honorary doctorate, 2015.
: Claude Bernard University Lyon 1 Honorary doctorate, 2 December 2015.
: University of Havana Honorary doctorate, May 2017.
: National University of Quilmes Honorary doctorate, May 2017
: Université Grenoble Alpes Honorary doctorate, 7 December 2017
: Universidad Nacional de Rosario Honorary doctorate, March 2018.

Also, in April 2010 he received the Prize for Exceptional Academic Achievement 2009 of the University of Illinois. On 3 December 2010, the UBA Cultural Center of Buenos Aires gave him the Faces and Masks Democracy Prize.

Work published

Books 
 Ecuador: From Banana Republic to Non Republic, Random House, Quito, 2009.
 "The Vulnerability of the Ecuadorian Economy: Toward better Economic Politics for Employment Generation, Reduction of poverty and Inequality," Program of the United Nations for Development (UNDP), Quito, 2004.
 "The Challenge of Development: Are We Prepared for the Future?," Publications of the San Francisco de Quito University, Quito, 1996.

Academic articles 
 "The Washington Consensus in Latin America: to a Quantitative Evaluation", working paper, San Francisco de Quito University, Quito, April 2002.
 "Structural Reform and Growth in Latin America: a sensitivity analysis", CEPAL Magazine, number 76, April 2002, Santiago de Chile.
 "One Market, One Currency: the Economic Desirability of Monetary Union for the CAN", working paper, University of Illinois at Urbana-Champaign, Illinois, May 2001.
 "Destabilizing Speculation in the Exchange Market: the Ecuadorian Marries", working paper. University of Illinois at Urbana-Champaign, Illinois, January 2000.
 "Endogenous Institutional Change? To a Critical View of the Political Economy of the Reforms: the Ecuadorian Marries", working paper. University of Illinois at Urbana-Champaign, Illinois, August 1999.
 "The Ecuadorian ISI Revisited", working paper, University of Illinois at Urbana-Champaign, Illinois, May 1999.

References

Sources

External links 

Official
 el Blog económico del Presidente de la República, Rafael Correa Delgado Economics blog of the President of Ecuador
 option=com_content&view=article&id=44&Itemid=78 President Rafael Correa Official website of the Presidency of Ecuador
 

Other
Biography by CIDOB Foundation (in Spanish)
 MSNBC, "Leftward Tilt: Political Shift in Latin America"
 Ecuador's Election: Revolution! Please Give Generously The Economist, 23 April 2009
 "The resignation of Rafael Correa, Ecuador's Economy Minister: an example of IFI's influence?"
 Rafael Correa on Global Capitalism, Why He Won't Renew the US Base in Manta, Chevron in the Amazon – video by Democracy Now!
 "Ecuadorian constitutional referendum, 2011" (in Spanish).
 "Ecuador's Economy Since 2007", May 2012, report from the Center for Economic and Policy Research
 "El Vice Presidente Lenin Moreno es nominado a Premio Nobel de la Paz".
 "Ecuador Chooses Stimulus over Austerity". The Real News. 17 February 2013.
 "Ecuador begins to roar". The Guardian. 7 April 2013.

|-

|-

|-

|-

1963 births
Catholic socialists
Collars of the Order of the Liberator General San Martin
Ecuadorian Christian socialists
20th-century Ecuadorian economists
Ecuadorian Ministers of Finance
Ecuadorian Roman Catholics
Ecuadorian revolutionaries
Ecuadorian socialists
Ecuadorian male writers
Ecuadorian politicians convicted of crimes
Grand Crosses of the Order of the Sun of Peru
Heads of government who were later imprisoned
Leaders of political parties in Ecuador
Living people
PAIS Alliance politicians
People from Guayaquil
Presidents of Ecuador
Presidents pro tempore of the Union of South American Nations
Presidents pro tempore of the Community of Latin American and Caribbean States
Socialism of the 21st century
Universidad Católica de Santiago de Guayaquil alumni
Université catholique de Louvain alumni
University of Illinois Urbana-Champaign alumni
Anti-imperialism in South America
Anti-Americanism
21st-century Ecuadorian politicians